Dak is a village in Talang Rural District, Talang District, Qasr-e Qand County, Sistan and Baluchestan Province, Iran. At the  census, its population was 540, in 161 families.

References 

Populated places in Qasr-e Qand County